David Fletcher (born 27 February 1989, Edwinstowe, Nottinghamshire) is a British cross-country mountain biker and cyclo-cross rider and 2009 British under-23 champion.

In 2006, came 18th in the junior world championship in New Zealand and was then helped by the Olympic Development Programme.

He finished 33rd in the European championship in the Netherlands. In September 2007, Fletcher was 3rd junior in the world championships in Fort William, Scotland. Fletcher rode for ScienceinSport in 2008.

Race results 2006/09

References

English male cyclists
Cyclo-cross cyclists
Cross-country mountain bikers
1989 births
Living people
People from Edwinstowe
Sportspeople from Nottinghamshire